Molzhaninovo, formerly Planernaya, is a railway station located on the north side of Khimki on the Moscow-St Petersburg Railway. It serves the Leningradsky suburban railway line.

History 
The platforms were opened in the late 1920s. It was originally called Pervomayskaya, but in 1932 it was renamed for the Osoaviakhim gliding school located nearby. Later, the school was replaced by the equestrian school of the "Spartak" sports organization, which eventually became the "Planernaya" Olympic training and sports center. Since the end of 2012, the northbound platform has been partly dismantled in connection with the laying of a new second track, and replaced by a wooden platform that provides egress from the four head cars of electric trains.

About the station 
It has two main landing platforms on the 1st and 2nd tracks. On the 3rd (middle) track in the 1990s, during the repair of the line section after a landslide, an additional short landing platform for one car was built. A pedestrian tunnel from the southern end of the station allows customers to transfer between platforms.

Exits to Luzhskaya Street and the Leningrad Highway (about 100 meters) and Starofilinskaya Street (about 300 meters to Filino Village, now part of Moscow, and the Spartak settlement of Khimki City District, Moscow Region). Within walking distance is the Olympic training and sports center "Planernaya", Khimki cemetery, and a unit of the Institute of Medical and Biological Problems of the Russian Academy of Sciences.

References 

Railway stations in Moscow
Khimki
Railway stations of Oktyabrskaya Railway